Alf Eriksson (born 1948) is a Swedish Social Democratic politician who has been a member of the Riksdag since 1992.

References
Alf Eriksson (S)

External links
Alf Eriksson

1948 births
Living people
Members of the Riksdag from the Social Democrats
Members of the Riksdag 2002–2006
Date of birth missing (living people)
Members of the Riksdag 1994–1998
Members of the Riksdag 1998–2002
Members of the Riksdag 2006–2010
Members of the Riksdag 1991–1994